The Commercial National Security Algorithm Suite (CNSA) is a set of cryptographic algorithms promulgated by the National Security Agency as a replacement for NSA Suite B Cryptography algorithms. It serves as the cryptographic base to protect US National Security Systems information up to the top secret level, while the NSA plans for a transition to quantum-resistant cryptography.

The suite includes

 Advanced Encryption Standard with 256 bit keys
 Elliptic-curve Diffie–Hellman and Elliptic Curve Digital Signature Algorithm with curve P-384
 SHA-2 with 384 bits, Diffie–Hellman key exchange with a minimum 3072-bit modulus, and
 RSA with a minimum modulus size of 3072.

The CNSA transition is notable for moving RSA from a temporary legacy status, as it appeared in Suite B, to supported status. It also did not include the Digital Signature Algorithm. This, and the overall delivery and timing of the announcement, in the absence of post-quantum standards, raised considerable speculation about whether NSA had found weaknesses e.g. in elliptic-curve algorithms or others, or was trying to distance itself from an exclusive focus on ECC for non-technical reasons.

In September 2022, the NSA announced CNSA 2.0, which includes its first recommendations for post-quantum cryptographic algorithms.

References 

Cryptography standards
National Security Agency cryptography
Standards of the United States